Moro Bay is an unincorporated community in Bradley County, Arkansas, United States.

References

External links
Arkansas State Parks - Moro Bay State Park

Unincorporated communities in Arkansas
Unincorporated communities in Bradley County, Arkansas